The 2003–04 A Group was the 56th season of the top Bulgarian national football league (commonly referred to as A Group) and the 80th edition of a Bulgarian national championship tournament.

This is the first season since the revision of the league rules after an unsuccessful attempt for a creation of a so-called Premier Professional Football League.

Overview
In the doorstep of the new millennium the Bulgarian Football Union decided to reform the football league system creating the Premier Professional Football League. The new top tier of Bulgarian football required all of its participants to be licensed as professional football clubs. The reforms also saw the number of teams reduced and introduced relegation play-offs during the years of its existence. The Bulgarian Premier League, however, was unsuccessful so from season 2003–04 the top Bulgarian league was re-established as the Bulgarian A Professional Football Group, returning to the traditions of A Republican Football Group and increasing the number of teams participating back to 16. Still, A Group retained the requirement of a professional status of all participants.

In the 2003–04 season Lokomotiv Plovdiv became champions for the first time in their history.

Teams
A total of 16 clubs contested the league, including 12 from the previous season in the tier, and 4 promoted from the second flight.

As before the start of the season, the top flight of Bulgarian football was once again restructured and the number of participants in the league was increased back to the traditional 16 teams from 14 the previous season, there were no promotion play-offs for the right to participate in A Group that season. Instead after the end of season 2002–03 the last two teams in the top level – Dobrudzha Dobrich placed 13th, and Rilski Sportist Samokov placed 14th – were directly relegated to B Group. 

The winners and the runners-up from the two divisions of B Group in season 2002–03 – Vidima-Rakovski and Rodopa Smolyan from the East division, and Belasitsa and Makedonska slava from the West division – were directly promoted to the top level of Bulgarian football. Vidima-Rakovski, Rodopa and Makedonska Slava all made their debut in the top tier, while Belasitsa Petrich returned after a one-year absence.

Stadia and Locations

Their home grounds are located as follows.

League table

Results

Champions
Lokomotiv Plovdiv

Serafimovski, Özgür, Georgiev and Spalević left the club during a season.

Top scorers

References

External links
Bulgaria – List of final tables (RSSSF)
2003–04 Statistics of A Group at a-pfg.com

First Professional Football League (Bulgaria) seasons
Bulgaria
1